Basutoland Ink is a Mosotho clothing company established in 2006. as a retailer in printed t-shirts and  sportswear, and is one of the leading brand names in Lesotho.

Sponsorships

National Teams
 2012-2019

Club Teams
 Matlama FC
 Linare FC 2019 - 
 Lioli FC 2013-2019

References

Clothing companies of Lesotho
Organisations based in Maseru
Clothing companies established in 2006
Sportswear brands
2006 establishments in Lesotho